The 2016 WNBA season was the 20th season of the Women's National Basketball Association (WNBA). Its regular season began on May 14 when the Indiana Fever hosted the Dallas Wings and concluded on September 18, with a Seattle Storm defeat of the Chicago Sky.

The playoffs began on September 21, with a new playoff format. To increase the level of competition, instead of the top 4 seeds from each conference advancing, the 8 teams with the best overall records, regardless of conference, advanced.

The top two teams, in this case the Minnesota Lynx and the Los Angeles Sparks, each received a double bye to the semi-final round. The number 3 and number 4 seeds, in this case the New York Liberty and the Chicago Sky, received one bye to the second round. The playoffs began with the number 5 seed Indiana Fever facing the number 8 seed Phoenix Mercury and the number 6 seed Atlanta Dream facing the number 7 seed, the Seattle Storm. The winners of those single elimination games, Phoenix and Atlanta, advanced to a second round of single elimination. The teams were reseeded so that the team with the worse overall record played the number 3 seed and the next worse record played the number 4 seed.

The second round of playoffs saw battles between Phoenix and New York in the first game and Chicago and Atlanta in the second game. The winners, Phoenix and Chicago respectively, went on to compete with the top two teams in the league, Los Angeles and Minnesota. Minnesota swept the Phoenix Mercury in 3 games. Los Angeles faced Chicago in 4 games, winning 2 at home, losing the third, and capitalizing on the fourth.

The finals was a Western Conference showdown between the defending champions, the Minnesota Lynx, and the Los Angeles Sparks. It was the Sparks' first finals appearance since 2003, and they were seeking their first win since 2002. Los Angeles won the first game 78–76 on a buzzer beater from forward Alana Beard. Minnesota bounced back to drop the Sparks 79–60 in game 2. Back at home in Los Angeles, the Sparks clinched game 3 with the final score of 92–75, to get to one win away from the title. However, despite home court advantage, the Lynx stormed back to win game 4 at Staples Center, 85–79. In front of a sold out crowd in Minneapolis, the Sparks shocked the Lynx with a 77–76 victory in game five on October 20. The 2016 WNBA Most Valuable Player and Sparks forward Nneka Ogwumike had the game-winning shot from an offensive rebound to put the Sparks ahead with 3.1 seconds remaining. It was the Los Angeles Sparks third title in franchise history.

The league took a hiatus for much of August, allowing for the participation of its players in the 2016 Summer Olympics.

2016 WNBA Draft
Seattle Storm selected Breanna Stewart first in the 2016 WNBA Draft at Mohegan Sun in Uncasville, CT. The draft was televised nationally on the ESPN networks (round 1 on ESPN2, rounds 2 and 3 on ESPNU).

Team standings
Source:
Eastern Conference

Western Conference

Playoffs

Notable occurrences 
On March 15, the WNBA announced a new league-wide sponsor, Verizon Wireless. The Verizon logo appeared on all jerseys except those of the Stars and Sun, and Verizon received significant branding in arenas, on jerseys, and in telecasts via commercials. Verizon also sponsored the WNBA Playoffs, WNBA Finals, WNBA Tip-Off, WNBA Draft, and WNBA Inspiring Women Luncheon.

On March 28, the WNBA introduced new jerseys for the 2016 season. Teams no longer had white home jerseys. Teams used the away jersey from the previous year or a secondary color-based alternate jersey. The Sparks and Stars already used their secondary colors for jerseys, and thus had no significant change. The jerseys included special patches commemorating the 20th season for the league, along with the three remaining original franchises, and showed the WNBA Championships each franchise has won by displaying the trophies on the back collar.

The ESPN Networks aired 14 games (1 on ESPN, 13 on ESPN2) during the regular season and all playoff games. NBATV showed 42 games across the regular season.

On June 25, Becky Hammon's jersey no. 25 was retired by the San Antonio Stars after their game against the Atlanta Dream. Her jersey was the first to be retired by the Stars.

On July 15, Lauren Jackson returned to Seattle to see her jersey retired after the Storm defeated the Mystics. Her jersey was the first to be put in the rafters by the Seattle Storm.

Statistics

Individual statistic leaders

Season award winners

Player of the Week award

Player of the Month award

Rookie of the Month award

Postseason awards

Coaches

Eastern Conference
Atlanta Dream: Michael Cooper
Chicago Sky: Pokey Chatman
Connecticut Sun: Curt Miller
Indiana Fever: Stephanie White
New York Liberty: Bill Laimbeer
Washington Mystics: Mike Thibault

Western Conference
Dallas Wings: Fred Williams
Los Angeles Sparks: Brian Agler
Minnesota Lynx: Cheryl Reeve
Phoenix Mercury: Sandy Brondello
San Antonio Stars: Dan Hughes
Seattle Storm: Jenny Boucek

References

 
Women's National Basketball Association seasons